Víctor Álvarez González (Gijón, born 1901) was an Asturian anarcho-syndicalist.

Biography 
A native of the Asturian city Gijón, he joined the local arm of the National Confederation of Labor (CNT). 

After the outbreak of the Spanish Civil War he joined the Confederal militias, commanding a CNT battalion in Asturias. A supporter of militarization, later joined the structure of the new Spanish Republican Army, coming to command the 3rd Asturian Brigade and the 1st Asturian Division. After the fall of the Northern Front, he returned to the central-southern Republican area, where he commanded the 22nd and 25th divisions, operating on the Andalusia, Levante and Extremadura fronts.

References

Bibliography 
 
 
 
 

People from Asturias
Spanish anarchists
1901 births
People from Gijón
Spanish military personnel of the Spanish Civil War (Republican faction)
Year of death missing